Hermosa (Lakota: okíčhize wakpá otȟúŋwahe; "battle river village") is a town near the northern edge of Custer County, South Dakota, United States. The population was 382 at the 2020 census.

History
Hermosa was platted in 1886. The name Hermosa is of Spanish origin meaning "beautiful". A post office has been in operation in Hermosa since 1886.

Geography
Hermosa is located at  (43.838786, -103.193978).

Hermosa has been assigned the ZIP code 57744 and the FIPS place code 28300.

Demographics

2010 census
As of the census of 2010, there were 398 people, 158 households, and 110 families living in the town. The racial makeup of the town was 88.7% White, 3.8% Native American, 1.0% Asian, 0.3% Pacific Islander, 0.5% from other races, and 5.8% from two or more races. Hispanic or Latino of any race were 5.3% of the population.

There were 158 households, of which 33.5% had children under the age of 18 living with them, 51.9% were married couples living together, 10.8% had a female householder with no husband present, 7.0% had a male householder with no wife present, and 30.4% were non-families. 20.9% of all households were made up of individuals, and 8.3% had someone living alone who was 65 years of age or older. The average household size was 2.52 and the average family size was 2.93.

The median age in the town was 36.8 years. 25.9% of residents were under the age of 18; 7.8% were between the ages of 18 and 24; 25.3% were from 25 to 44; 29.3% were from 45 to 64; and 11.6% were 65 years of age or older. The gender makeup of the town was 50.3% male and 49.7% female.

2000 census
As of the census of 2000, there were 315 people, 130 households, and 82 families living in the town. The population density was 809.8 people per square mile (311.9/km2). There were 139 housing units at an average density of 357.3 per square mile (137.6/km2). The racial makeup of the town was 92.38% White, 1.59% African American, 3.81% Native American, 0.32% from other races, and 1.90% from two or more races. Hispanic or Latino of any race were 2.86% of the population.

There were 130 households, out of which 30.8% had children under the age of 18 living with them, 50.0% were married couples living together, 8.5% had a female householder with no husband present, and 36.2% were non-families. 28.5% of all households were made up of individuals, and 13.1% had someone living alone who was 65 years of age or older. The average household size was 2.42 and the average family size was 2.98.

In the town, the population was spread out, with 26.0% under the age of 18, 7.0% from 18 to 24, 27.9% from 25 to 44, 26.0% from 45 to 64, and 13.0% who were 65 years of age or older. The median age was 37 years. For every 100 females, there were 93.3 males. For every 100 females age 18 and over, there were 102.6 males.

The median income for a household in the town was $35,341, and the median income for a family was $37,031. Males had a median income of $29,000 versus $16,750 for females. The per capita income for the town was $13,147. About 8.0% of families and 9.1% of the population were below the poverty line, including 11.8% of those under age 18 and 8.6% of those age 65 or over.

See also
 List of towns in South Dakota

References

External links

Towns in Custer County, South Dakota
Towns in South Dakota